The 2021 World Para Powerlifting Championships was a powerlifting competition for athletes with a disability. It was held in Tbilisi, Georgia from 27 November to 5 December. It was previously scheduled to be held in Batumi, Georgia and, before that, it was scheduled to be held in Eger, Hungary.

The tournament was one of the compulsory tournaments to qualify for the 2024 Summer Paralympics in Paris, France.

Medal table

Senior

Junior

Medalists

Men

Women

Mixed

Junior Men

Some events were held but no medals were awarded.

Junior Women

Some events were held but no medals were awarded.

References

External links
Results Book Junior
Results Book Senior

World Para Powerlifting Championships
World Para Powerlifting Championships
World Para Powerlifting Championships
World Para Powerlifting Championships
Sports competitions in Tbilisi
World Para Powerlifting Championships
World Para Powerlifting Championships
World Para Powerlifting Championships
World Para Powerlifting Championships